Peter Johnstone may refer to:

Peter Johnstone (mathematician) (born 1948), professor of mathematics
Peter Johnstone (governor) (born 1944), Governor of Anguilla
Peter Johnstone (rugby union) (1922–1997), New Zealand rugby union player
Peter Johnstone (footballer) (1887–1917), Scottish footballer

See also
Peter Johnston (disambiguation)